"Love Revolution" is a song by British singer Will Young. It was written by Young and Kish Mauve members Mima Stilwell and Jim Elliott for his sixth studio album 85% Proof (2015), while production was helmed by the latter. The song features lyrics and melody from the song "Share the Love," written by Ivan Matias and Andrea Martin, which was originally released on Martin's Arista Records debut album The Best of Me in 1998 and later re-worked into the track "Loneliness" by German DJ Tomcraft. Due to the inclusion of the sample, Matias and Martin are also credited as songwriters. Released by Island Records as the album's first single on 30 March 2015, it reached number 103 on the UK Singles Chart.

Background
"Love Revolution" was written by Young and Kish Mauve members Mima Stilwell and Jim Elliott, while production was helmed by the latter. The song features lyrics and melody from the song "Loneliness" by German DJ Tomcraft which in turn samples from the song "Share the Love," originally and written by Ivan Matias and Andrea Martin for Martin's Arista Records debut album The Best of Me (1998). Commenting on the sample, Young said: "I didn't set out to do any samples, it's all about the music, if something comes up that works in the song, then it works in the song [...] It's a great track, it came about because Jim Eliot, who does the music from Kish Mauve, came back and said "look I've flipped the track completely and we can do this" – and I said "that's awesome"."

Critical reception
Idolator editor Robbie Daw felt that the song "pulls its influences from Motown, Northern Soul and legendary funk band Sly And The Family Stone, and allows for Will to completely cut loose, vocally. Like Adele, Mark Ronson and Sam Smith, we can now chalk Will Young up as another British artist currently steering clear of radio’s pure pop sound." 
Caroline Sullivan from The Guardian described the song as "get-happy R&B clappiness." Mark Goggin from The Gay UK found that "Love Revolution" "throws us a funkier sound that we haven't seen from [Young] in a while, slightly nodding back to the soulful elements of his 2005 album Keep On [...] Much less Euro dance though, I'm afraid, but much more summer soul that will get you dancing around your garden in no time at all."

Music video
A video for "Love Revolution" was directed by Chino Moya and premiered on Young's Vevo channel on 30 March 2015. The clip depicts Young as a "grinning, evangelical" salesman trying to shift his faceless Love Revolution products to his "brain-dead followers."

Credits and personnel
 Jim Eliot – producer, writer
 Stuart Hawkes – mastering engineer
 Andrea Martin – writer (sample)
 Ivan Matias – writer (sample)
 Mark Rankin – mixing engineer
 Mima Stilwell – writer
 Will Young – vocals, writer

Charts

Release history

References

Will Young songs
2015 songs
2015 singles
Songs written by Will Young
Songs written by Jim Eliot
Songs written by Andrea Martin (musician)
Songs written by Mima Stilwell
Songs written by Ivan Matias
Island Records singles